Renato Micallef (born 19 November 1951) is a Maltese pop singer. His full name is Nazzareno Alessandro Micallef Garrett.  Renato has been active in the Maltese music scene since the age of 12.

Renato has toured North America, Australia and the United Kingdom where his website claims he won an award for Singer Of The Year in 1980.

In 1975, he represented Malta in the Eurovision Song Contest, finishing in 12th place with Singing This Song. In 1990, he represented Malta again in the Cavan International Song Festival, with the song Our Little World of Yesterday, which won first prize.

He has also hosted his own Television and Radio including the popular Separju on Super One Radio and also toured with one of his favourite singers, Shirley Bassey. His record releases include Ave Maria and Lovin' You. Renato is also a very popular local entertainer and performs regularly in leading venues.

References

External links
 Eurovision 1975 website, http://www.eurovision-contest.com/1975/Malta/
 Performance of 'Singing This Song', http://video.google.com/videoplay?docid=3117796263490940038
 Gensna: A nation's music, http://www.timesofmalta.com/life/view/20090321/features/gensna-a-nations-music

1951 births
Living people
Maltese pop singers
20th-century Maltese male singers
20th-century Maltese singers
Eurovision Song Contest entrants for Malta
Eurovision Song Contest entrants of 1975